The Ministry of Energy, Hydropower and Hydrocarbons is a Guinean government ministry whose current minister is Ibrahima Abé Sylla

Organization 
 Minister
 Secretary General
 Chef de Cabinet
 Energy Advisor
 Legal Advisor
 Direction Nationale de l’Energie (DNE)
 Bureau de Stratégie et de Développement (BSD)
 Electricité de Guinée (EDG)
 Agence Guinéene de l’Electrification Rurale (AGER)

Officeholders since 2010

References 

Politics of Guinea
Energy ministries
Government ministries of Guinea